The term Dearborn Massacre refers to two historical events:

 The Fort Dearborn massacre in 1812
 The shooting of protesters at the Ford Hunger March in 1932